Santa Cruz District is one of eleven districts of the province Santa Cruz in Peru. According to the 2005 census, the district has a total population of 9,627 inhabitants.

References

External links